Hsieh Ho-hsien (known professionally as R.Chord, and sometimes A Chord; born 15 April 1987) is a Taiwanese singer and actor. A Chord is known mainly for writing the lyrics of the song, "Gou Ai," which was played on the Taiwanese drama, The X-Family. "Gou Ai" was also performed on K.O.3an Guo by Pets Tseng. The song has also been parodied multiple times on K.O.3an Guo.

Biography 

R Chord was named Ho-hsien (和弦), meaning "chord," by his grandfather. R Chord started to play the guitar at a very young age due to the influence of his grandfather, who he looked up to as a role model.

By the year 2004, aged 16, R Chord had composed around 50–60 songs and won a songwriting competition. He attended Guess Guess Guess during the competition period, and was favourably received by the audience. The prize was a contract with HIM International Music, but R Chord did not take up the offer of the contract and instead, went to play underground music with his band, SEA-LEVEL (海平面).

R Chord made his first acting debut in KO One (終極一班) as Shayu (鯊魚), following up with many other appearances in other Taiwanese dramas, notably as his character, aChord in Taiwanese drama The X-Family (終極一家), in which he appeared as a person with supernatural powers tasked with the responsibility of protecting the Dimension. He then played the character Dashu (大樹) in Hanazakarino Kimitachihe (花樣少年少女) in the year 2006.

Songs
A Chord has composed many songs for Taiwanese dramas such as KO Ones "Zhōngjí yī bān" (終極一班), where he helped to write the lyrics such as, Gou Ai (夠愛) from The X-Family (2007), and recently, "Nǐ céngjīng ràng wǒ xīndòng" (你曾經讓我心動) from They Kiss Again (2007).

He has also helped Danson Tang write the song "Zhǐ qiàn yījù wǒ ài nǐ" (只欠一句我愛你) in Danson's 1st debut album, Ai Wo (愛我).

He has recently recorded more songs such as "Duì nǐ ài bù wán" (對你愛不完) and "Guòláirén" (過來人).

DiscographyAlbums: (2009.02) A Chord (我叫做謝和弦 謝和弦是我的本名) (EP)
 (2009.04) Nothing But A Chord (雖然很芭樂)
 (2009.12) The Earth Is Actually Not That Dangerous (地球其實沒有那麼危險) (EP)
 (2011.05) Growing Up (於是長大了以後)
 (2015.06) The Crazy Ones (不需要裝乖)
 (2016.08) Time To Let The World Know (要你知道)
 (2018.12) Be Water (像水一樣)
 (2020.12) 2203 (2203扣人心弦(上))
 (2022.03) Hamen''' (哈們)

 T.V shows The X-Family (終極一家) as A Chord (GTV, 2007)Hanazakarino Kimitachihe (花樣少年少女) as Dashu (GTV, 2006)The Graduate (畢業生) as A Guo (Ep.2) (PTS, 2006)KO One'' (終極一班) as Shayu (GTV, 2005)

MTV appearances 
愛我 – Danson Tang 唐禹哲

晨間新聞 - Tanya Chua 蔡健雅

安全感 – S.H.E

References

External links 
A Chord's English Forum
A Chord's Blog

1987 births
Taiwanese male television actors
Living people
People from Nantou County
21st-century Taiwanese  male singers